The Mederville Bridge is a historic structure located in the unincorporated community of Mederville, Iowa, United States. This is one of only a few open spandrel arch bridges constructed in Iowa. Designed by the Marsh Engineering Company of Des Moines, it replaced a covered timber Howe truss bridge. Clayton County rejected all of the original bids to build the structure when they all came in too high. Six companies bid a second time on the project, and F. E. Marsh and Company of Des Moines won. They completed in the bridge in 1918 for $17,454.32. It was listed on the National Register of Historic Places in 1998. 
 On October 2, 2021, it was the site where Kelsey Bergan and Mark Schutte got married.

See also
List of bridges documented by the Historic American Engineering Record in Iowa

References

External links

Bridges completed in 1918
Bridges in Clayton County, Iowa
Historic American Engineering Record in Iowa
National Register of Historic Places in Clayton County, Iowa
Road bridges on the National Register of Historic Places in Iowa
Arch bridges in Iowa
Concrete bridges in the United States
Open-spandrel deck arch bridges in the United States